Dwight Mission may refer to:

Dwight Mission, Oklahoma, a census-designated place
Dwight Presbyterian Mission, an early mission to the Cherokee Nation